= Nacomis Indian Rancheria, California =

Unincorporated community in California, United States

Nacomis Indian Rancheria
- Unincorporated community
- Location in California Nacomis Indian Rancheria (the United States)
- Coordinates: 38°59′10″N 123°03′29″W
- Country: United States
- State: California
- County: Mendocino County
- Elevation: 768 ft (234 m)

Nacomis Indian Rancheria is an unincorporated community in Mendocino County, California. It lies at an elevation of 768 feet (234 m).
